Oresuki (俺好き), short for , is a Japanese harem–romantic comedy light novel series written by Rakuda and illustrated by Buriki. ASCII Media Works published seventeen volumes from February 2016 to January 2022 under their Dengeki Bunko imprint.

A manga adaptation with illustration by Yū Ijima was serialized via Shueisha's online manga app Shōnen Jump+ from February 2017 to August 2020. It has been collected in six tankōbon volumes. An anime television series adaptation by Connect aired from October to December 2019. An OVA was released in September 2020.

Synopsis

Oresuki revolves around Amatsuyu "Joro" Kisaragi, an ordinary high school student who is invited out alone by two beautiful girls: the upperclassman Sakura "Cosmos" Akino and his childhood friend Aoi "Himawari" Hinata. Expecting to hear their confessions, he triumphantly goes to meet each of them in turn. However, both Cosmos and Himawari confess to Joro that they like his best friend, Taiyо̄ "Sun-chan" Ōga, instead of him. He reluctantly agrees to help both girls pursue Sun-chan in the hope of dating the loser, only to suddenly be confessed to by the unremarkable bookworm Sumireko "Pansy" Sanshokuin, who is the girl Sun-chan is in love with.

Media

Light novel
Ore wo Suki Nano wa Omae Dake ka yo is written by Rakuda and illustrated by Buriki. ASCII Media Works published the first volume on February 10, 2016 under their Dengeki Bunko imprint. The seventeenth and last volume was published on January 8, 2022.

Manga
A manga adaptation, illustrated by Yū Ijima, was serialized on Shueisha's online manga app Shōnen Jump+ from February 26, 2017 to August 23, 2020. The manga was compiled into six tankōbon volumes.

Anime
An anime television series adaptation was announced at the "Dengeki Bunko 25th Anniversary Fall Dengeki Festival" event on October 7, 2018. The series was animated by Connect and directed by Noriaki Akitaya, with Rakuda handling series composition, Shoko Takimoto designing the characters, and Yoshiaki Fujisawa composing the music. The series aired from October 3 to December 26, 2019 on Tokyo MX, GYT, GTV, BS11, TVA, and ytv. Shuka Saitō performed the series' opening theme song "Papapa", while Haruka Tomatsu, Haruka Shiraishi, and Sachika Misawa performed the series' ending theme song "Hanakotoba". Aniplex of America licensed the series for distribution in English speaking regions, and streamed the series on Crunchyroll, FunimationNow in North America and the United Kingdom, HIDIVE in North America, and AnimeLab in Australia and New Zealand. An OVA was set to premiere on May 23, 2020, but was delayed to September 2, 2020.

See also
List of harem anime and manga
Shine Post — Another light novel series by the same author and illustrator.

Notes

References

External links
 

2019 anime television series debuts
2016 Japanese novels
2020 anime OVAs
Anime and manga based on light novels
Anime postponed due to the COVID-19 pandemic
Aniplex
Connect (studio)
Dengeki Bunko
Harem anime and manga
Japanese webcomics
Kadokawa Dwango franchises
Light novels
Romantic comedy anime and manga
Shōnen manga
Shueisha manga
Television shows based on light novels
Tokyo MX original programming
Webcomics in print